Biotronik (BIOTRONIK SE & Co. KG; Biotronik Worldwide) is a limited partnership multi-national cardiovascular biomedical research and technology company, headquartered in Berlin, Germany.

The company offers equipment for diagnosis, treatment, and therapy support in the areas of cardiac rhythm management, electrophysiology, and vascular intervention.  In the area of cardiac rhythm management, Biotronik Home Monitoring uses tele-monitoring technology to provide doctors with up-to-date information for implant patients.

Biotronik employs more than 9,000 people worldwide in over 100 countries, with research and development activities in Europe, North America, and Singapore.  It produces all critical components of its products in-house.  One in every five employees at its Berlin headquarters works in research and development (R&D).

History
BIOTRONIK began with the development of the first German implantable pacemaker (Biotronik IP-03) in 1963.  The pacemaker was developed at the Technical University of Berlin by physicist Max Schaldach (1936–2001), a professor of biomedical technology at the Friedrich-Alexander-University of Erlangen-Nuremberg (FAU), and electrical engineer Otto Franke.  In the early years, the company worked to improve pacemakers' capacity and battery life, and secure the connections among electrodes, pacemakers, and the heart.  Since its start, more than 19 million BIOTRONIK devices in over 100 countries have been implanted.

In 1976, the company moved to Sieversufer 8 in Berlin-Neukölln.  In 1979, a US production site in Lake Oswego, Oregon was built.  This subsidiary resulted from the acquisition of the American pacemaker producer Stimulation Technology, Inc.  At the same time, with the development and production of advanced hybrid circuitry and structural components for the medical technology industry, the company also began to develop circuits for pacemakers.  In the 1980s, the dual-chamber stimulation method (DDD) was developed, leading to the manufacturing of a pacemaker that could read and react to spontaneous contractions of the atrium, and better respond to them of its own accord.  To this end, BIOTRONIK developed the Diplos 03, a multi-programme DDD pacemaker with bilateral telemetry, which made it a European market leader and increased its presence in South America and Asia.

In 1987, the firm moved its headquarters to Woermannkehre 1, next door to its previous location.  In 1993, BIOTRONIK produced the first German implantable cardioverter defibrillator (ICD), among them the Phylax 06.  Closed loop stimulation (CLS), which integrates the pacemaker into the body's own regulatory system, thereby allowing it to react to patients’ changing physical and emotional activity, was introduced in the 1990s.  Also in 1993, BIOTRONIK developed fractal coating for implantable electrodes.  This coating optimises the electrically active surface of the electrode, thereby improving its perception and stimulation properties.  BIOTRONIK remains the only manufacturer of fractal-coated electrodes.

In 1994 and 1995 respectively, BIOTRONIK began offering a full spectrum of electrophysiology products and vascular intervention products.  BIOTRONIK also develops and produces balloon catheters and stents for the treatment of coronary artery disease.  With Philos, the company has offered a complete pacemaker family with telemetry since 2000, when it received CE Mark approval for the product, and also successfully implanted the first pacemaker with Home Monitoring (remote patient monitoring).  Home Monitoring has shown significant clinical benefits, including over a 50% reduction in mortality of heart failure patients.

With the Lumax 540 VR-T DX in 2010, BIOTRONIK launched the first and only single-chamber defibrillator with comprehensive atrial diagnostics worldwide.  Additionally, the company entered into an exclusive international distribution partnership with the Swiss medical technology company Endosense to distribute their ablation catheter TactiCath with optical contact force.  The following year, BIOTRONIK released Orsiro to the market, the world's first hybrid drug-eluting stent with a bio-absorbable coating, adding to innovative treatment options combatting coronary artery disease.

In 2011, BIOTRONIK was the subject of an investigation by the United States Department of Justice (US DoJ) into payments made to doctors in Nevada, United States, who use the company's products in their practices.  The case was settled in 2014.  In 2013, a similar investigation began and was settled involving payments to physicians in Oregon.

In 2012, the company acquired the old Postfuhramt, a historical brick postal building on Berlin's Oranienburger Strasse in the sub-neighbourhood of Spandauer Vorstadt, in the district of Mitte. 

The following year, BIOTRONIK launched BioMonitor, a type of mini ECG device that offers continuous monitoring and daily remote data collection.  In addition, BIOTRONIK also developed the world's first series of implantable defibrillators that enable patients, including those suffering heart failure, to undergo MRI scans under certain conditions.  BIOTRONIK's ProMRI® technology includes systems approved for 1.5 T and 3.0 T MR scanning, as well as full-body scanning.  The company offers the broadest portfolio of pacemakers, defibrillators, and therapies approved to undergo MRIs, with more than 1,000,000 ProMRI® devices and leads implanted worldwide.  To navigate through this portfolio, BIOTRONIK invented two online tools in 2016 and 2017; the ProMRI®SystemCheck and ProMRI®Configurator, correspondingly.

For radiation protection, BIOTRONIK distributes the Zero-Gravity Radiation Protection System, which consists of a movable suspended body and head shield.  The shield material has a significantly higher lead equivalency than traditional radiation apparel, thereby reducing radiation exposure by 87–100%.

Indicated to treat peripheral artery disease in the lower limbs, BIOTRONIK released the Passeo-18 Lux in 2014 as the first peripheral drug-coated balloon.  The year following, CardioMessenger Smart was launched, its new patient device for Home Monitoring, and BioMonitor 2, the second-generation insertable cardiac monitor.

In February 2016, BIOTRONIK Inc. opened an Education and Innovation Center, a training facility and meeting location in New York City.

Awards
In 2007, BIOTRONIK was given the EuroPCR 2007 Novelty Award for its innovative absorbable metal stents (AMS) by the European Association of Percutaneous Cardiovascular Interventions (EAPCI).  In 2009, it was nominated for the German Future Prize for its Home Monitoring system by the German Federal Ministry of Education and Research.  In 2010, BIOTRONIK endowed the Berlin-Brandenburg Academy of Sciences and Humanities' Technical Science Prize, first awarded to Till Schlösser.  The CARDIOSTIM Innovation Award for Practice Improvement was granted to BIOTRONIK for its MRI AutoDetect.

Partnerships
BIOTRONIK partners with the EPIC Alliance, a global network of female electrophysiologists, in aims to increase collaboration and support for women in the field of electrophysiology.

Business focus
Cardiac rhythm management: pacemakers, implantable defibrillators, electrodes, cardiac monitors, external monitoring and programming devices
Electrophysiology: products for electrophysiological examinations and therapy, including ablation and diagnostic catheters 
Vascular intervention: products for coronary and peripheral functions including stent systems, balloon catheters and guide wires

Headquarters and locations

Europe & Middle East
Germany
Berlin, Germany
Berlin-Neukölln, company headquarters with over 2,400 employees
Berlin-Mitte
Erlangen, Centre for Technology and Service, with over 130 employees
Rostock-Warnemünde, Germany, Competence Centre for Stent Development and Production
Austria
Vienna
Belgium
Vilvoorde
Czech Republic
Prague-Nusle
Denmark
Hørsholm
France
Rungis
Israel
Kohav Yair
Italy
Vimodrone
Netherlands
Nijmegen
Poland
Poznań
Spain
Madrid
Switzerland
Baar
Bülach, manufacturing of stents and balloon catheters
United Kingdom
Bicester, England

Asia
Hong Kong
Beijing, China
Kolkata, India
Mapo-gu, South Korea
Mumbai, India
New Delhi, India
Seoul, South Korea 
Singapore 
Tokyo, Japan

North America
Lake Oswego, Oregon, US headquarters and manufacturing facility
New York City, US education and innovation center
Toronto, Ontario, Canada

South America
Buenos Aires, Argentina
São Paulo, Brazil (since 1982)

Oceana
Pymble, New South Wales, Australia

Products and therapies

Bradycardia therapy 
Pacemakers (Edora, Evity, Enitra, Enticos, Eluna, Epyra, Etrinsa, Evia, Entovis)
Electrodes (Solia, Safio S, Siello, Setrox, Selos)
Tachycardia therapy 
Defibrillators (Rivacor, Acticor, Intica NEO, Ilivia, Inventra, Iperia, Idova, Ilesto,) 
Electrodes (Linox smart, Protego, Plexa)
Electrophysiology 
Ablation catheters (AlCath Flux eXtra Gold, AlCath Flutter, AlCath)
Steerable diagnostic catheters (GuidIQ, ViaCath)
External devices (Qubic RF, Qubic Stim, Qiona)
Cardiac resynchronization 
CRT defibrillators (Ilivia, Inventra, Ipera, Idova, Ilesto,)
CRT pacemakers (Edora, Evity, Enitra, Enticos, Eluna, Epyra, Etrinsa, Entovis, Evia)
Electrodes (Corox OTW, Sentus OTW BP, Sentus OTW QP, Sentus OTW QP xx/49) 
Lead systems and accessories (Selectra, ScoutPro, ScoutPro IC)
Guide wires (Streamer, VisionWire)
Coronary vascular intervention
Bio-resorbable scaffold (Magmaris) 
Drug-eluting stent system (Orsiro)  
Balloon-expanding cobalt chromium coronary stent systems (PRO-Kinetic Energy, PK Papyrus) 
Drug-releasing balloon catheter (Pantera Lux) 
Balloon catheters (Pantera Pro, Pantera, Pantera LEO, AngioSculpt)  
Guide wires (Cruiser, Galeo Pro, Galeo Magnum)  
Accessories (3Flow, Neptune Pad)
Peripheral vascular intervention
Balloon-expanding stent systems (Dynamic, Dynamic Renal, PRO-Kinetic Energy Explorer), 
Self-expanding stent systems (Astron, Astron Pulsar, Pulsar-18, Pulsar-35)
Balloon catheters (Passeo-18 Lux, Passeo-35, Passeo-35 HP, Passeo-14, Passeo-18),
Guide wires (Cruiser-18, Cruiser)
Introducer sheaths (Fortress)
Insertable cardiac monitor (BioMonitor 2, BioMonitor)
External devices (Renamic, Reocor, ICS 3000, Reliaty)
Patient devices for Home Monitoring (Cardio Messenger, CardioMessenger 2, CardioMessenger Smart)

References

External links

www.BIOTRONIK.com — global portal

Medical technology companies of Germany
Multinational companies headquartered in Germany
Cardiac electrophysiology
Implants (medicine)
Manufacturing companies based in Berlin
German brands
Technology companies established in 1963
1963 establishments in West Germany
German companies established in 1963